Alexander Vladimirovich Arhangelskii (Aleksandr Vladimirovich Arkhangelsky, born 13 March 1938 in Moscow) is a Russian mathematician. His research, comprising over 200 published papers, covers various subfields of general topology. He has done particularly important work in metrizability theory and generalized metric spaces, cardinal functions, topological function spaces and other topological groups, and special classes of topological maps. After a long and distinguished career at Moscow State University, he moved to the United States in the 1990s. In 1993 he joined the faculty of Ohio University, from which he retired in 2011.

Biography
Arhangelskii was the son of Vladimir Alexandrovich Arhangelskii and Maria Pavlova Radimova, who divorced by the time he was four years old. He was raised in Moscow by his father. He was also close to his uncle, childless aircraft designer Alexander Arkhangelsky. In 1954, Arhangelskii entered Moscow State University, where he became a student of Pavel Alexandrov. At the end of his first year, Arhangelskii told Alexandrov that he wanted to specialize in topology.

In 1959, in the thesis he wrote for his specialist degree, he introduced the concept of a network of a topological space. Now considered a fundamental topological notion, a network is a collection of subsets that is similar to a basis, without the requirement that the sets be open. Also in 1959 he married Olga Constantinovna.

He received his Candidate of Sciences degree (equivalent to a Ph.D.) in 1962 from the Steklov Institute of Mathematics, supervised by Alexandrov. He was granted the Doctor of Sciences degree in 1966.

It was in 1969 that Arhangelskii published what is considered his most significant mathematical result. Solving a problem posed in 1923 by Alexandrov and Urysohn, he proved that a first-countable, compact Hausdorff space must have a cardinality no greater than the continuum. In fact, his theorem is much more general, giving an upper bound on the cardinality of any Hausdorff space in terms of two cardinal functions. Specifically, he showed that for any Hausdorff space X,

where χ(X) is the character, and L(X) is the Lindelöf number. Chris Good referred to Arhangelskii's theorem as an "impressive result", and "a model for many other results in the field." Richard Hodel has called it "perhaps the most exciting and dramatic of the difficult inequalities", a "beautiful inequality", and "the most important inequality in cardinal invariants."

In 1970 Arhangelskii became a full professor, still at Moscow State University. He spent 1972–75 on leave in Pakistan, teaching at the University of Islamabad under a UNESCO program.

Arhangelskii took advantage of the few available opportunities to travel to mathematical conferences outside of the Soviet Union. He was at a conference in Prague when the 1991 Soviet coup d'état attempt took place. Returning under very uncertain conditions, he began to seek academic opportunities in the United States. In 1993 he accepted a professorship at Ohio University, where he received the Distinguished Professor Award in 2003.

Arhangelskii was one of the founders of the journal Topology and its Applications, and volume 153 issue 13, July 2006, was a special issue, with most of the papers based on talks given at a special conference held at Brooklyn College 30 June–3 July 2003 in honor of his 65th birthday.

Selected publications

Books

Papers

References

External links
Personal profile at Ohio University

1938 births
Living people
Moscow State University alumni
Academic staff of Moscow State University
Ohio University faculty
Mathematicians from Moscow
Topologists
Russian expatriates in the United States
Soviet mathematicians